The men's 100 metre backstroke was a swimming event held as part of the swimming at the 1928 Summer Olympics programme. It was the fifth appearance of the event, which was established in 1908. The competition was held from Tuesday to Thursday, 7 to 9 August 1928.

Nineteen swimmers from twelve nations competed.

Records
These were the standing world and Olympic records (in minutes) prior to the 1928 Summer Olympics.

In the first heat George Kojac set a new Olympic record with 1:09.2 minutes. In the final he set a new world record with 1:08.2 minutes.

Results

Heats

Tuesday 7 August 1928: The fastest two in each heat and the fastest third-placed from across the heats advanced. As there was a tie for second place in the fifth heat both swimmers advanced instead of a third placed.

Heat 1

Heat 2

Heat 3

Heat 4

Heat 5

Semifinals

Wednesday 8 August 1928: The fastest three in each semi-final advanced.

Semifinal 1

Semifinal 2

Final

Thursday 9 August 1928:

References

External links
Olympic Report
 

Swimming at the 1928 Summer Olympics
Men's events at the 1928 Summer Olympics